Jan Sergiusz Gajek (born Jan Gajek on 2 February 1949) is the Apostolic Visitor for Greek-Catholic Christians on the territory of Belarus.

He was born into a Polish Roman Catholic family in Łyszkowice, central Poland, and graduated from a local school and from a gymnasium.

In August 1967, Gajek joined the Congregation of Marian Fathers. Between 1967 and 1974, he studied at the Catholic University of Lublin. In the late 1960s, Gajek became engaged in activities of the exiled Belarusian clergy. He had contacts with the Belarusian cultural and religious centre in London, including bishop Ceslaus Sipovich and Robert Tamushanski. On 23 June 1974, he was ordained to the priesthood, and served for several years in a parish in Głuchołazy.

The following two years Gajek studied at the Theology Faculty of the Catholic University of Lublin. After that he was sent to Rome, where from 1978 to 1983 he studied at the Pontificia Instituto Orientale. In November 1983, Gajek became Doctor and returned to Poland. From 1983 to 1999, he worked at the Catholic University of Lublin.

As leader of Greek Catholics in Belarus
In 1994, Pope John Paul II appointed Gajek Apostolic Visitor for Greek Catholics in Belarus. In 1996, Gajek became Archimandrite and corresponding member of the Pontifical Academy of Mary. In 1997, he became adviser of the Congregation for the Oriental Churches.

Gajek is author of numerous scientific publications on Christianity in the Slavonic East.

Gallery

Sources
 Biography on the website of the St. Joseph Minsk Greek Catholic Centre

Living people
Belarusian religious leaders
Belarusian Eastern Catholic priests
Polish Eastern Catholics
John Paul II Catholic University of Lublin alumni
Polish emigrants to Belarus
Congregation of Marian Fathers of the Immaculate Conception
1949 births
20th-century Eastern Catholic clergy
21st-century Eastern Catholic clergy
Pontifical Oriental Institute alumni